The 1930 Philadelphia Athletics season involved the A's finishing first in the American League with a record of 102 wins and 52 losses. It was their second of three consecutive pennants. In the 1930 World Series, they defeated the St. Louis Cardinals in six games. This was the A's final World Series championship in Philadelphia. They would next win the World Series 42 years later, in 1972, after they had moved to Oakland.
When playing the Cleveland Indians on July 25, the Athletics became the only team in Major League history to execute a triple steal twice in one game.

Regular season
The A's had three Hall of Famers in their starting line-up: Mickey Cochrane, Jimmie Foxx, and Al Simmons. Simmons won the AL batting title with a .381 average. Pitching ace Lefty Grove won the pitching triple crown.

Season standings

Record vs. opponents

Roster

Player stats

Batting

Starters by position
Note: Pos = Position; G = Games played; AB = At bats; H = Hits; Avg. = Batting average; HR = Home runs; RBI = Runs batted in

Other batters
Note: G = Games played; AB = At bats; H = Hits; Avg. = Batting average; HR = Home runs; RBI = Runs batted in

Pitching

Starting pitchers
Note: G = Games pitched; IP = Innings pitched; W = Wins; L = Losses; ERA = Earned run average; SO = Strikeouts

Other pitchers
Note: G = Games pitched; IP = Innings pitched; W = Wins; L = Losses; ERA = Earned run average; SO = Strikeouts

Relief pitchers
Note: G = Games pitched; W = Wins; L = Losses; SV = Saves; ERA = Earned run average; SO = Strikeouts

Awards and honors

American League top five finishers
Max Bishop
 #4 on-base percentage (.426)

Mickey Cochrane
 #5 batting average (.357)

George Earnshaw
 #2 strikeouts (193)
 #3 wins (22)

Jimmie Foxx
 #3 home runs (37)
 #3 runs batted in (156)
 #3 on-base percentage (.429)
 #4 slugging percentage (.637)

Lefty Grove
 #1 wins (28)
 #1 earned run average (2.54)
 #1 strikeouts (209)

Al Simmons
 #1 batting average (.381)
 #1 runs scored (152)
 #2 runs batted in (165)
 #3 slugging percentage (.708)
 #5 home runs (36)

1930 World Series 

AL Philadelphia Athletics (4) vs. NL St. Louis Cardinals (2)

References

External links
Baseball Reference: 1930 Philadelphia Athletics
Baseball Almanac: 1930 Philadelphia Athletics
The Baseball Cube: 1930 Philadelphia Athletics
Philadelphia Athletics Historical Society: 1930 Philadelphia Athletics

Oakland Athletics seasons
Philadelphia Athletics season
American League champion seasons
World Series champion seasons
Oakland